Jessica Baglow (born 23 March 1989) is an English actress, known for Gentleman Jack, Where the Heart Is and Waterloo Road.

Early life and career
Baglow was born in Doncaster, South Yorkshire, England. She began her acting career at the age of 7, being cast as Pam Ferris's daughter, Lucy Snow, in the popular ITV series Where The Heart Is. She was one of the show's original cast members, but after 6 series her character left with her screen father for a new life away from Yorkshire. After leaving Where the Heart Is she then appeared in a number of adverts for Oxo in 2003 in the company's bid to introduce a new Oxo family, but the adverts failed to take off. After a couple of acting roles in TV shows Wing and a Prayer and Doctors she gained notice in an episode of the first series of BBC's The Street in 2006.

Further parts in New Street Law and a semi regular role in TV soap Emmerdale followed in 2007, before at the age of 18 Baglow was cast as Karla Bentham in Waterloo Road. Her portrayal of a student with Asperger syndrome won acclaim and gained her considerable notice during her three years on the show, as she began to progress from child roles to more adult subjects. Baglow subsequently trained at the prestigious London Academy of Music and Dramatic Art (LAMDA) graduating in 2012.

Career
Baglow primarily focused on television as a child, but upon graduating from LAMDA she gained many highly praised theatre credits. In 2015, she was commended at the Ian Charleson Awards for her role as Marina in Dominic Dromgoole's production of Pericles at Shakespeare's Globe theatre. Dominic Cavendish of The Daily Telegraph wrote: "Jessica Baglow is a big find as Pericles's daughter Marina – calmness and dignity personified in her perturbing scenes of abduction and sexual exploitation."

In 2019, she appeared in the acclaimed BBC series Gentleman Jack, about the lesbian diarist and noblewoman Anne Lister, playing her ladies maid Hemingway. It was a significant series for Baglow to do, as around the same time in her personal life she came out as gay and in a relationship on her Instagram account. Her character returned for the show's 2nd series in 2022. Between then she has also appeared in Silent Witness in the episode "Reputations" as the character DI Ruth Cracknell, the drama Floodlights and The Railway Children Return.

Filmography

Television

Film

See also

References

External links

1989 births
Living people
20th-century English actresses
21st-century English actresses
Actresses from Yorkshire
Actors from Doncaster
Alumni of the London Academy of Music and Dramatic Art
English child actresses
English stage actresses
English television actresses